Colin Doyle may refer to:

Colin Doyle (footballer) (born 1985), Irish footballer
Colin Doyle (lacrosse) (born 1977), Canadian lacrosse player